Pachybatenus is a genus of ground beetles in the family Carabidae. This genus has a single species, Pachybatenus obscurus. It is found in Mozambique.

References

Platyninae
Monotypic beetle genera